Moose Factory 68 is a First Nations reserve on the Moose River in Cochrane District, Ontario. It is one of two reserves of the Moose Cree First Nation.

References

Communities in Cochrane District
Nishnawbe Aski Nation
Cree reserves in Ontario